Jocelyn Moore may refer to:

 Jocelyn Wardrop-Moore (born 1932), British alpine skier
 Jocelyn Moore (businessperson), American National Football League official